Chain Reaction is the only album by Canadian band Luba featuring Luba Kowalchyk as vocalist. It was produced by Tony Green for his own label. The album contains songs in the early New Wave music style. It was made available on compact disc in 1996.

Note that initially Luba was the name of the band and not Luba Kowalchyk's stage name. In 1982, Luba Kowalchyk was signed by Capitol Records as the artist Luba and the remaining members served as her backup band.

Track listing
Chain Reaction  – 3:37
Runaround  – 3:42
I Stand Alone  – 4:53
Heaven In Your Eyes  – 3:39
Lookin' At Love - 4:02
Stay - 5:03
Have A Heart - 3:29
Lovers In The Night - 3:42
Seems Like A Dream - 6:04
Black & White - 3:01

Personnel
 Luba: Vocals
 Peter Marunzak: Drums
 Michael (Bell) Zwonok: Bass
 John Nestorowich: Rhythm Guitar, Vocals
 Mark Lyman: Lead & Rhythm Guitar
 Doug Short: Keyboards

References

 The Ectophiles' Guide to Good Music. Luba: Credits. Retrieved Apr. 17, 2007.

External links
 Official Luba Website
 Luba at canoe.ca
 Luba on MySpace

1980 debut albums
Luba (singer) albums
Albums produced by Tony Green